Tony the Tiger is the advertising cartoon mascot for Kellogg's Frosted Flakes breakfast cereal.

"Tony the Tiger" may also refer to:
 Tony Clark, a former baseball player who spent much of his career with the Detroit Tigers
 Tony Lopez (boxer), a former professional boxer from Sacramento, California
 Tony Stewart, the NASCAR Sprint Cup Driver from Columbus, Indiana
 Tony Thompson (boxer), a professional heavyweight boxer from Maryland
Tony Sbalbi, French ski mountaineer

See also
Tiger (disambiguation)

Lists of people by nickname